A list of films produced in Egypt in 1973. For an A-Z list of films currently on Wikipedia, see :Category:Egyptian films.

External links
 Egyptian films of 1973 at the Internet Movie Database
 Egyptian films of 1973 elCinema.com

Lists of Egyptian films by year
1973 in Egypt
Lists of 1973 films by country or language